Rafael Bogaerts (born 16 August 1993) is a Belgian basketball player for Gembo BBC and the Belgian 3x3 national team.

He represented Belgium at the 2020 Summer Olympics.

References

External links
 

1993 births
Living people
3x3 basketball players at the 2020 Summer Olympics
Belgian men's basketball players
Belgian men's 3x3 basketball players
Forwards (basketball)
Olympic 3x3 basketball players of Belgium
People from Arlon
Sportspeople from Luxembourg (Belgium)